Taekwondo at the 2014 Summer Youth Olympics was held from 17 to 21 August at the Nanjing International Expo Center in Nanjing, China. There will be five weight classes for each gender.

Qualification
Each National Olympic Committee (NOC) can enter a maximum of 6 competitors, 3 per each gender. 74 places will be decided in a qualification tournament held in Taipei at 20–21 March 2014.  The top 7 of each weight category and the eighth places in the events China did not choose to participate in will qualify. As hosts, China was initially given the maximum quota, but has chosen to participate only in the boys' +73 kg and girls' -49 kg, -63 kg, +63 kg weight categories. A further 20, 10 in each gender will be decided by the Tripartite Commission.

To be eligible to participate at the Youth Olympics athletes must have been born between 1 January 1997 and 31 December 1999. Furthermore, all athletes must be a Kukkiwon Dan or Poom certificate holder.

Schedule

The schedule was released by the Nanjing Youth Olympic Games Organizing Committee.

All times are CST (UTC+8)

Medal summary

Medal table

Boys' events

Girls' events

References

External links
Official Results Book – Taekwondo

 
2014 Summer Youth Olympics events
Youth Summer Olympics
2014
Taekwondo competitions in China
2014 in women's taekwondo